Christoforos Nezer (1887 – 19 February 1970) was a Greek actor.

He was descended from the Bavarian Nezer family, who came to Greece with King Otto, and the cousin of actress Marika Nezer. He was a self-taught actor and played a leading role in the establishment of National Theatre of Greece.

Filmography

External links

1887 births
1970 deaths
Greek people of Bavarian descent
Male actors from Athens
Greek male film actors
Greek male stage actors
20th-century Greek male actors